This is a list of treaties of the Confederate States of America.

The Confederate States of America (CSA) was not officially recognized as a sovereign state by any foreign nation. Thus, the CSA did not enter into any bilateral or multilateral treaties with other states.

However, in 1861, the CSA authorized Albert Pike—the CSA "Commissioner to all the Indian Tribes West of Arkansas and South of Kansas"—to negotiate and conclude treaties with native Indian tribes resident in Indian Territory. Pike concluded nine treaties with Indian tribes between July and October 1861. Each of the nine treaties were ratified by the CSA Congress prior to the end of the year.

References
Henry Putney Beers, The Confederacy: A Guide to the Archives of the Confederate States of America (Washington DC: National Archives and Records Administration, 1968).
Kenny A. Franks, "An Analysis of the Confederate Treaties with the Five Civilized Tribes," The Chronicles of Oklahoma 50(4):458 (1972).

External links
"As long as grass shall grow and water run: The treaties formed by the Confederate States of America and the tribes in Indian Territory, 1861", University of Nebraska—Lincoln

Confederate States of America
Confederate States of America
1861 treaties
Indian Territory in the American Civil War
Treaties
1861 in the United States
Confederate treaties
Confederate treaties